La Llumanera de Nova York was a monthly illustrated publication, edited in Catalan in New York by writer Artur Cuyàs i Armengol, and illustrated by Felip Cusachs, in a delicate moment for the relationship between Spain and Cuba, and the puissance of the Catalan Renaixença.

73 issues were published, from November 1874 to May 1881.  A large number of Catalan writers and artists of that time, such as Rossend Arús i Arderiu and Joan Almirall i Forasté, collaborated with it, and even Serafí Pitarra was correspondent in Barcelona.  Catalans which lived in America also collaborated with the publication, as the sculptor Domingo Mora.

It was the first solid journalist experience of interconnection between Catalonia and the United States and it featured the position of Catalan bourgeoisie which favoured the maintenance of Cuba under the Spanish domination.

References

External links

 Modern page that tries to follow the heritage of the original journal
 Digitization is available through the portal ARCA (Arxiu de Revistes Catalanes Antigues= Old Catalan Serials Archive)
 Facsimiles of all the issues of La Llumanera de Nova York
 History of the journal

Monthly magazines published in the United States
Catalan-language magazines
Catalan-language mass media in the United States
Defunct magazines published in the United States
Magazines established in 1874
Magazines disestablished in 1881
Spanish-American culture in New York City
Magazines published in New York City